Demandice is a village and municipality in the Levice District in the Nitra Region of south-west Slovakia.

History
In historical records the village was first mentioned in 1291. Until the 16th century the village belonged to the noble family Deméndi de Theszéri.

Geography
The village lies at an altitude of 143 metres and covers an area of 21.925 km².
It has a population of about 995 people.

Facilities
The village has a public library a gym and a  cinema.

Genealogical resources

The records for genealogical research are available at the state archive "Statny Archiv in Banska Bystrica, Nitra,

Slovakia"

 Roman Catholic church records (births/marriages/deaths): 1732-1895 (parish A)
 Lutheran church records (births/marriages/deaths): 1746-1895 (parish B)

See also
 List of municipalities and towns in Slovakia

External links
https://web.archive.org/web/20070427022352/http://www.statistics.sk/mosmis/eng/run.html
http://www.demandice.sk
Surnames of living people in Demandice

Villages and municipalities in Levice District